Marmaduke Dove (died ) was an American politician from Maryland. He served as a member of the Maryland House of Delegates, representing Harford County from 1861 to 1862.

Career
Dove served as a member of the Maryland House of Delegates, representing Harford County from 1861 to 1862.

Personal life
Dove died in or before October 1866.

References

Year of birth unknown
1860s deaths
People from Harford County, Maryland
Members of the Maryland House of Delegates